"The Word Is Love (Say The Word)" is a 1997 house music song by Steve "Silk" Hurley, released under the alias Steve "Silk" Hurley & The Voices of Life, featuring vocals by Sharon Pass.

Background
Apart from others record companies, the single was released on the producer's own label Silk Entertainment in several editions. The composition written by Hurley himself along with M-Doc didn't catch much attention in US. In the overseas, it scored a modest success on the UK Singles Chart, where the single peaked at number twenty-six in March 1998.

Credits and personnel
Steve Hurley – writer, producer, remix
M-Doc – writer
Sharon Pass – lead vocal
Jivan Diwano – keyboards
Anthony Higgins – remix
Four Shades – remix
Jon Hardy – remix
Nick Law – remix
Simon Lewicki – remix
Sushi Twins – remix
Tim McGee – remix
Wicked Peach – remix
Frankie Feliciano – remix
Mousse T. – remix
Groovehunter – remix
Kelly G – remix, additional producer
Jerome Brown – bass
Steve Turner – bass
Steve Weeder – engineer

Official versions
"The Word Is Love (7" Radio Edit)" – 4:00
"The Word Is Love (Silk's Radio Anthem)" – 3:32
"The Word Is Love (Silk's Anthem of Life)" – 8:58
"The Word Is Love (Silk's Anthem of Life Instrumental)" – 6:48
"The Word Is Love (Silk's Original of Life)" – 5:56
"The Word Is Love (Kelly "Lets You Go" Radio Edit)" – 3:08
"The Word Is Love (Kelly "Lets You Go" Mix)" – 7:13
"The Word Is Love (Kelly G Bump 'N' Say Mix)" – 6:10
"The Word Is Love (Kelly G's Bump N' Love Mix)" – 7:38
"The Word Is Love (Kelly G. Dub)" – 5:21
"The Word Is Love (Kelly G "Say It" Underground Mix)"
"The Word Is Love (Mousse T's Kinda Deep Mix)" – 6:43
"The Word Is Love (Mousse T.'s Kinda Dope Mix)" – 9:01
"The Word Is Love (Mousse T's Kinda Dope Dub)" – 6:20
"The Word Is Love (Mousse T's for the Heads Mix)" – 7:53
"The Word Is Love (Mousse T's Kinda Deep Instrumental)" – 6:42
"The Word Is Love (Mousse T's For The Heads Instrumental)" – 7:53
"The Word Is Love (Mood II Swing Dub)" – 7:31
"The Word Is Love (Four Shades Dub)" – 6:26
"The Word Is Love (Sushi Twins' Dirty Phunkofile Mix)" – 6:53
"The Word Is Love (Wicked Peach Mix)" – 5:56
"The Word Is Love (Frankie Feliciano's Recanstruction Vocal Mix)" – 9:47
"The Word Is Love (Frankie Feliciano's Recanstruction Instrumental)"
"The Word Is Love (Unreleased Mix)" – 6:08
"The Word Is Love (Say The Word) (Groovehunter Vocal Mix)"
"The Word Is Love (Say The Word) (Groovehunter Dub Mix)"

Charts

See also
List of artists who reached number one on the U.S. Dance Club Songs chart

References

External links
 The Word Is Love (Say the Word) release page on Discogs

1997 songs
1997 singles
1998 singles
Steve "Silk" Hurley songs
Songs written by Steve "Silk" Hurley
Songs written by M-Doc